Grays Ferry, also known as Gray's Ferry, is a neighborhood in South Philadelphia bounded (roughly) by 25th Street on the east, the Schuylkill River on the west, Vare Avenue on the south, and Grays Ferry Avenue on the north.  The section of this neighborhood west of 34th Street is also known as Forgotten Bottom. Grays Ferry shares borders with Southwest Center City to the North, Point Breeze to the East, and Girard Estate to the South. Gray’s Ferry is across from where Mill Creek debouches at about 43rd street. Historically, Grays Ferry was one of the largest enclaves of Irish Americans in the city, and while there are still many Irish left, it is now home to a significant African American population.

History

The area developed near an important crossing of the Schuylkill River. In the 18th century, Gray's Ferry was the southernmost of three ferries that crossed the Schuylkill River to Philadelphia. The neighborhood's namesake ferry originally belonged to a Benjamin Chambers in the 17th century. By 1747 George Gray had taken over the ferry, and established the nearby Gray's Inn and Gray's Garden, which were popular in the 1790s. The river is now spanned by the Gray's Ferry Bridge and several rail bridges.

Before the Act of Consolidation, 1854, this neighborhood was part of Moyamensing Township. Moyamensing was chartered by the Dutch governor Alexander d'Hinoyossa, and in 1684, William Penn confirmed the title.

This neighborhood was once the site of the Schuylkill Arsenal.

The James Alcorn School, Charles Y. Audenried Junior High School, Grays Road Recreation Center, James McCann Foundation, University Avenue Bridge, and Anthony Wayne School are listed on the National Register of Historic Places.

Demographics
 Black, 56%; White, 39%; Other, 5%.
 More than 30% of the residents are under 18.
 Currently the neighborhood, which represents less than 1% of the city’s population, houses more than 10% of the city’s Section 8 residents.

Tasker Homes and Greater Grays Ferry Estates
The Tasker Homes (also known as the Tasker Housing Project) were located at 29th and Morris Streets and visible from the Schuylkill Expressway. Originally, the housing project had 1,100 units and followed the city's general model of high-density, low-income housing.

During Mayor John Street's administration, the Philadelphia Housing Authority declared certain higher density housing as blighted, demolishing it and replacing with lower density, townhome-style public housing. In 2004, the Tasker Homes were demolished and replaced with the Greater Grays Ferry Estates. The new townhomes have increased tensions between working-class residents and occupants of Section 8 housing within the neighborhood. The reasons most often cited are memories of the problems with Tasker Homes.

Racial tension
Over the years, the neighborhood has seen numerous instances of racial violence. The Irish Catholics living in the neighborhood's modest row homes clashed with African Americans living in the demolished Tasker Homes and newly built Greater Grays Ferry Estates. There have been riots and beatings and, sometimes, killings. Tensions peaked in 1997 when Nation of Islam leader Louis Farrakhan threatened to join marchers to protest racial violence, but spoke at a church rally in a compromise negotiated by Mayor Ed Rendell.

As the housing market has boomed in Philadelphia, the neighborhood has begun to see some resurgence. Where the former housing projects intersect with the neighborhood, a group of neighbors have started turning an empty lot into a new park at 30th and Oakford, and the area is beginning to see a trickle of young professionals overflowing from the nearby Graduate Hospital area.

See also

Rambo's Rock
Odunde Festival

External links
 Grays Ferry official community website
 Grays Ferry Irish Society
 Greater Grays Ferry Estates Homeowners Association Keeping the Estates in a Better State
 The place where you live: Grays Ferry South Philly Review
 Philadelphia City Paper A Prayer for Grays Ferry
 Grays Ferry Redevelopment Area Plan, from 1968
 Grays Ferry Near Philadelphia, a sketch from 1789.
 Historic Photographs of Grays Ferry, PhillyHistory.org

References

Neighborhoods in Philadelphia
Irish-American neighborhoods
Irish-American culture in Philadelphia
Public housing in Philadelphia
South Philadelphia